Titisee station is a railway station in the municipality of Titisee-Neustadt, located in the Breisgau-Hochschwarzwald district in Baden-Württemberg, Germany.

Notable places nearby
Titisee

References

Railway stations in Baden-Württemberg
Buildings and structures in Breisgau-Hochschwarzwald